Wingard may refer to:

People
 Adam Wingard (born 1982), American film director
 Andrew Wingard (born 1996), American football player
 Carl-Gunnar Wingård (1894–1977), Swedish actor
 Carl Fredrik af Wingård (1781–1851), Swedish politician
 Chad Wingard (born 1993), Australian Rules Football player
 Corey Wingard, Australian politician
 Edgar Wingard (1878–1927), American college football head coach
 John Wingard (1927–2021), American politician and farmer

Other uses
 Wingård, a Danish-Swedish family of German origin
 Wingard, Saskatchewan, Canada

See also
 Weingart (disambiguation)
 Weingarten (disambiguation)